Charlotte of Belgium (Marie Charlotte Amélie Augustine Victoire Clémentine Léopoldine; 7 June 1840 – 19 January 1927), known by the Spanish version of her name, Carlota, was by birth a Princess of Belgium and member of the House of Wettin in the branch of Saxe-Coburg and Gotha (as such she was also styled Princess of Saxe-Coburg and Gotha and Duchess in Saxony). As the wife of Archduke Maximilian of Austria, Viceroy of Lombardy–Venetia and later Emperor of Mexico, she became Archduchess of Austria (in 1857) and Empress consort of Mexico (in 1864). She was daughter, granddaughter, sister, sister in-law, cousin and wife of reigning or deposed sovereigns throughout Europe and Mexico.

Since the beginning of her marriage, she feuded with Empress Elisabeth in Vienna, and was glad when her husband was posted to Italy as Viceroy of Lombardy–Venetia. At this time, he was selected by the Emperor Napoleon III as a figurehead for his proposed French Empire in Mexico, and Charlotte overcame her husband's doubts about the plan. Maximilian and Charlotte (known by the Spanish Carlota) duly arrived to Mexico City in 1864, but their reign lasted a little over three years. She assisted her husband, who let her rule as regent during his absences from Mexico, for which reason she is considered the first woman to rule in the Americas. When Emperor Napoleon III ordered the withdrawal of French military aid intended to support Maximilian, the situation of the Mexican imperial couple became untenable.

On her own initiative, Charlotte decided to go personally to Europe in order to attempt a final approach to Paris and the Vatican. She landed in France in August 1866, but suffered the successive refusals of both Emperor Napoleon III and Pope Pius IX. In Rome, the failure of her mission appeared to compromise her mental health to the point that an alienist doctor advocated the confinement of Charlotte in Miramare Castle. It was during her stay under house arrest that Emperor Maximilian was deposed and executed by Benito Juárez in June 1867. Unaware that she was now a widow, Charlotte was brought back to Belgium and confined successively in the Pavilion de Tervueren (in 1867 and again during 1869–1879), the Palace of Laeken (during 1867–1869) and finally at Bouchout Castle in Meise (from 1879), where she remained for the next 48 years in a deleterious mental state, giving rise to much speculation ever since, before dying in 1927 aged 86.

Life

Birth and early years

Marie Charlotte Amélie Augustine Victoire Clémentine Léopoldine of Saxe-Coburg and Gotha, better known under the name Charlotte, was the daughter of King Leopold I of Belgium and Louise of Orléans. Her first name pays homage to the late Princess Charlotte of Wales, her father's first wife. She was the fourth and last child and the only daughter of the Belgian royal couple, after Louis-Philippe (who died less than one year old in 1834), Leopold (born in 1835) and Philippe (born in 1837). Queen Louise's last pregnancy was so difficult there were fears of a miscarriage in April, but on 7 June 1840 at 1 a.m., Charlotte was born healthy at the Palace of Laeken. Initially disappointed by the birth of a daughter, who was not a dynast in Belgium at that time, King Leopold I was gradually charmed by his daughter, who became in time his favorite child. Through her mother, Charlotte was a granddaughter of Louis Philippe I and Maria Amalia of the Two Sicilies, King and Queen of the French and through her father, she was a first-cousin of Queen Victoria of the United Kingdom of Great Britain and Ireland; thanks to these relations, and in addition to regular stays in the city of Ostend in the summer, Charlotte spent long holidays with her maternal grandparents in the French royal residences and at her cousin's in Windsor Castle. She was close to her maternal grandmother, Queen Maria Amalia, and the two regularly corresponded; after the French Revolution of 1848 which dethroned her grandparents and exiled them to England, for a few weeks out of the year, Charlotte stayed in Claremont with her mother's family in exile.

When her mother died on 11 October 1850, Charlotte was only 10 years old. The boisterous and expansive little girl quickly became a pensive and introverted teenager. The late Queen Louise had personally overseen the education and instruction of the royal children. Respecting the wishes of his deceased wife, the King appointed Countess Denise d'Hulst, a French aristocrat, to take particular care of Charlotte, of whom she became governess. Fleeing Laeken as soon as he could, Leopold I had little presence with his children, who suffered as a result. Very early on, Charlotte was able to express herself orally and in writing in French, English and German. Her religious instruction was in charge of Victor-Auguste-Isidor Deschamps, later Cardinal and Archbishop of Mechelen and therefore Primate of Belgium. Religion held a major place in the life of the princess.

Leopold I demanded that his children carry out frequent examinations of conscience, believing that crowned heads must possess great strength of character. After Madame d'Hulst returned to France, it was Countess Marie-Auguste de Bovée, her new governess, who educated Charlotte, urging her to read and meditate daily on The Imitation of Christ. At the age of 13, her favorite author was Plutarch, while she judged Ovid to be childish. Very early on, she was convinced that royalty would have to be more accountable to God than the rest of humanity. Her obsession with learning made society bland, she wrote at 15. At this age, Charlotte was seen as a distant beauty, aware of her dignity and seeking to achieve unattainable moral perfection. She had a tendency to judge those around her harshly and got along more with her brother Philippe than with Leopold.

Marriage

In her youth, Charlotte resembled her mother, and was noted as being a beauty possessing delicate features. This, combined with her status as the only daughter of the King of the Belgians, made her a desirable match. In 1856, as she was preparing to celebrate her sixteenth birthday, two suitors sought her hand: Prince George of Saxony (who was quickly rejected) and King Pedro V of Portugal. The latter was the favorite candidate of both Queen Victoria and King Leopold I. By personal choice, and under the influence of Madame d'Hulst (who affirmed that at the Portuguese court no priest would understand her), Charlotte declined the offer of marriage with King Pedro V. She explained: "As for Pedro, it is a throne, it is true, I would be Queen and Majesty but what is that, the crowns nowadays are heavy burdens and how one regrets later to have yielded to such crazy considerations".

In the month of May 1856, Charlotte met in Brussels with Archduke Maximilian of Austria, younger brother of Emperor Franz Joseph I. She was immediately charmed by this prince who was eight years her senior. Reportedly she stated: "it will be him that I will marry". Her father left Charlotte the choice of her future husband; as she testified in a letter addressed to her grandmother Maria Amalia: "He wrote me the most impartial letter, putting before my eyes the advantages of one and the other without wanting to influence me in any way". As for Leopold I, he wrote to his future son-in-law: "You won in May [...] all my confidence and my benevolence. I also noticed that my little girl shared these dispositions; however it was my duty to proceed with precaution". Charlotte declared: "If, as it is in question, the Archduke was invested with the Viceroyalty of Italy, that would be charming, that's all I want". The official engagement was celebrated on 23 December 1856.
 
Charlotte appeared elated by the prospect of her marriage to Maximilian, praising a fiancé for whom she envisioned an exceptional destiny. Maximilian appeared less enthusiastic when negotiating the dowry of his bride.  The Archduke said of his fiancée: "She's short, I'm tall, which must be. She's brunette, I'm blonde, which is good too. She is very intelligent, which is a bit annoying, but I will undoubtedly get over it". The marriage ceremony was celebrated on 27 July 1857 at the Royal Palace of Brussels. This alliance with the House of Habsburg-Lorraine enhanced the legitimacy of the recently established Belgian dynasty.

Emperor Napoleon III presented the couple with a bisque bust of Charlotte as a wedding gift. In the Court of Vienna she was welcomed by her mother-in-law, Archduchess Sophie, who saw in her the perfect example of a wife for an Austrian Archduke. This contributed to the strained relationship between Charlotte and Empress Elisabeth of Austria, wife of Franz Joseph I, whom Sophie treated rather cruelly. It is said that Charlotte disliked the deep connection that existed between Elisabeth and Maximilian, who were confidantes and shared the same tastes for many things, especially because her sister-in-law was universally admired for her beauty and charm.

Life in Italy and Miramare

In September 1857, Emperor Franz Joseph I of Austria appointed his brother Maximilian as Viceroy of the Kingdom of Lombardy–Venetia. After a short stop in Schönbrunn, where they met the Austrian Imperial family, the newlyweds went to Maximilian's Miramare Castle where they stayed for eight days. They then visited Venice and Verona. On 6 September 1857, Charlotte and Maximilian made a solemn entry into Milan, where they were warmly welcomed. Some newspapers claimed their entry was made to appear ridiculous because of excessively ornate carriages and liveries. Leopold, Duke of Brabant, wrote to the Count of Flanders: "All the servants wore halberds! In Paris, we talked a lot about this [...]. If we sin here through too much simplicity, they are blamed for a buffoonish luxury from another time and which nowadays seems too out of place".

In Italy, the Archducal couple officially resided in Milan, seat of the government of Kingdom of Lombardy–Venetia. Sometimes staying at the Royal Palace they  also spent time at the more intimate Villa of Monza. In his capacity as Viceroy, Maximilian was served by a substantial important court including chamberlains and majordomos. Charlotte was surrounded by a grand-mistress, ladies-in-waiting and a large suite. Charlotte appears to have enjoyed her time in Venice. During Easter of 1858, she and Maximilian journeyed down the Grand Canal aboard a ceremonial gondola. Charlotte also visited several charitable institutions and schools. Feasts and balls were given in their honour but the local aristocrats were conspicuous with their absences.

In 1859, Charlotte acquired the island of Lokrum and its ruined convent. She and Maximilian proceeded to transform the Benedictine abbey into a secondary residence. On a private level, Maximilian began to neglect his wife, who complained, after a year of marriage, of loneliness and boredom.

On 10 April 1859, Maximilian was obliged by his brother the Emperor to resign from his office as Viceroy of Lombardy–Venetia. He had sought to undertake reforms considered as being too liberal by the government in Vienna, as well as showing indulgence towards Italian rebels and being too much of a spendthrift.

Charlotte and Maximilian therefore retired to Miramare Castle at one end of the Gulf of Trieste. The construction of the castle continued throughout 1860, according to plans prepared by Maximilian and financed in part from Charlotte's dowry. Her brother, the future Leopold II, noted in his diary: "The construction of this palace in these days is a limitless madness". During this time in Miramare, Charlotte painted an idyllic portrait of this retreat though the estrangement of the spouses appeared to became more marked. Charlotte practiced horseback riding, painting and swimming. She played a major part in planning the layout and statuary of the extensive gardens of Miramare, while contributing some of her own paintings to the gallery of the palace. 

In December 1859 Charlotte and Maximilian embarked on a voyage aboard the yacht Fantasia, which took them to Madeira in December 1859, on the spot where Princess Maria Amélia of Brazil, once engaged to Maximilian, had died six years previously. In this place, the Archduke experienced intense regret and melancholic thoughts. Charlotte remained alone in Funchal for three months while her husband continued his journey to Brazil, where he visited three states: first Bahia, then Rio de Janeiro and finally Espírito Santo. On his return from his trip, Maximilian returned via Funchal where he and Charlotte prepared to return to Trieste. First they made a stopover in Tétouan, where they docked on 18 March 1860.

On 3 October 1863, a delegation of conservative Mexican notables arrived at Miramare Castle to formally offer the Archduke the crown of their country. They were mostly reactionary expatriates who were resident in Europe and enjoyed only limited support in their native country. In reality, negotiations on this subject had been underway for more than two years: Emperor Napoleon III envisaged creating a "Latin and Catholic" satellite state in Mexico, which would limit the influence of the United States of America, then in the grip of the Civil War. He was encouraged in this project by the prospect of recovering French investments and loans put at risk by the chaotic political situation in Mexico. With Papal support he accordingly searched for a suitable figurehead to serve as the nominal emperor of Mexico. His choice was Maximilian, who no longer held any power in the Austrian-ruled parts of northern Italy and was eager for a more challenging role. The Emperor of the French promised to support Maximilian militarily if he agreed to leave for Mexico. However, Maximilian hesitated and was slow to agree to this venture. Emperor Franz Joseph I was ambivalent to the proposal and his ministers questioned its wisdom. Maximilian made his assent subject to ratification by the Mexican people. The strong-willed Charlotte believed that restoring the Mexican crown would constitute a mission to bring order and civilization under the House of Habsburg, who would once again rule an empire where the sun never sets; she argued decisively to overcome her husband's doubts. Maximilian accepted the Mexican crown and the couple prepared for their trip for the New World.

Empress of Mexico

Departure for Mexico

On 10 April 1864, in a state apartment of Miramare Castle, Maximilian and Charlotte were informally proclaimed as Emperor and Empress of Mexico. He affirmed that the wishes of the Mexican people allowed him to consider himself as the legitimate elected representative of the people. In reality, the Archduke was persuaded by a few Mexican conservatives who incorrectly assured him of massive popular support. For supporting documents, the Mexican deputation produced "acts of adhesion" containing population numbers for localities within Mexico that were purportedly surveyed. Maximilian instructed the delegation "to ensure by all means the well-being, prosperity, independence and integrity of this nation". 

The same evening, an official dinner was planned at Miramare in the large salon at Les Mouettes. Now on the verge of a nervous breakdown, Maximilian retired to his apartments, where he was examined by his doctor August von Jilek, who found the new Emperor prostrate and so overwhelmed that the doctor instructed him to rest in the garden house of the estate. Charlotte therefore presided at the banquet alone. The departure for Mexico was set for 14 April. Once on board the Austrian frigate SMS Novara and escorted by the French frigate Thémis, Maximilian became more serene. He and Charlotte made a stopover in Rome to receive the blessing of Pope Pius IX. On 19 April, during the pontifical audience at the Palace of Maffei Marescotti, the subject of the recovery of church property confiscated by the Mexican republican government was avoided. However, the Pope stressed that Maximilian would have to respect the rights of the Church.

During the long crossing, Charlotte and Maximilian rarely discussed the serious diplomatic and political difficulties which they were to be confronted with in Mexico. Instead, they spent their time preparing the etiquette of their future court in great detail. They began to write a 600-page manuscript relating to ceremonial functions, regulating protocol in its most minute aspects. The SMS Novara stopped in Madeira and Jamaica. The ships encountered heavy thunderstorms before a final stopover was made in Martinique. With the port of Veracruz in front of her, Charlotte wrote to her grandmother: "In a few hours we will touch the ground of our new homeland...I am delighted with the Tropics and I only dream of butterflies and hummingbirds [...] I would never have believed that in what regards the regions where we are going to live, my wishes were also completely fulfilled".

Reign

Maximilian and Charlotte arrived at the port of Veracruz on 28 May 1864 and made entry into Mexico City on 12 June with a warm welcome. Unimpressed by the National Palace, which required major refurbishment, they preferred Chapultepec Castle as their new Imperial residence. They also chose the Palace of Cortes in Cuernavaca as a summer residence. Shortly after their arrival in Mexico, they commenced costly improvements to their various properties and surroundings, despite the Mexican treasury being in a critical condition. Charlotte took a leading role in the various festivals, military parades, balls and theatrical performances presented in their honour. She also presided over the newly created Mexican Imperial Order of Saint Charles, or 'Orden Imperial de San Carlos', designed to reward charitable or other service to the Mexican nation.

Despite the idyllic descriptions of Mexico that Maximilian and Charlotte wrote to their relatives in Europe, it did not take long for them to realize the insecurity and disorder which plagued their Empire. Their residences were perpetually monitored by a large armed guard intended to push back the rebel bands which roamed nearby. French intervention, supported by the Belgian and Austrian contingents and local Mexican Imperial troops, was followed by a long civil war which disrupted every aspect of Mexican life. The approximately 30,000 to 40,000 soldiers of the French expeditionary force, led by Marshal Bazaine, had to counter multiple skirmishes led by the guerrillas over a territory four times larger than that of France.

A conservative minority of the Mexican people supported the Second Mexican Empire, along with the Mexican nobility, clergy, and some native groups. The Emperor tried in vain to reconcile the liberal and conservative parties. He decided to pursue a liberal policy by approving the secularization of ecclesiastical property for the benefit of the national domain, which alienated the conservatives and the clergy. When he was absent from Mexico City, sometimes for several months, Maximilian appointed Charlotte as Regent: she presided over the Council of Ministers and gave public audiences on Sundays. The popularity of the sovereigns was already dwindling before the end of the first year of their reign.

Without a child from his marriage, Maximilian, to Charlotte's disapproval, decided in September 1865 to adopt Agustín de Iturbide y Green and Salvador de Iturbide y de Marzán, grandsons of Agustín I de Iturbide, an earlier Emperor of Mexico (r. 1822–23), thus founding the House of Habsburg-Iturbide. Agustín was only two years old when he was adopted and was forcibly separated from his mother, under Maximilian's orders. This situation upset Charlotte, who was forced by her husband to go and fetch the child herself from his biological parents. By this point, public opinion of Maximilian was almost unanimously negative. He gave Agustín de Iturbide y Green the title of "His Highness, The Prince of Iturbide" and similar imperial titles were accorded to various members of the child's extended family. He also ensured that the secret treaty between him and the House of Iturbide was published in European newspapers, which prevented Charlotte or anyone else from being able to attempt a reversal of the adoption. Despite these actions, it appears Maximilian never intended to give Agustín or Salvador the throne, because they were not of royal blood. He himself explained that it was all a charade to convince his younger brother Archduke Karl Ludwig of Austria to give him one of his sons to act as heir.

A year after the arrival of Maximilian and Charlotte, the situation in Mexico remained unstable. Charlotte wrote: "As disaster does not come alone, the interior continues to be ravaged. Bands emerge as if from underground where there was none before". The perpetual question of financing caused relations between France and Mexico to deteriorate. The Republicans of former Mexican President Benito Juárez began to enlist men and arms from the United States of America, where the Civil War had just concluded. The Belgian Legion, composed of 4,000 men, was roundly defeated by the Juarist troops at the Battle of Tacámbaro (11 April 1865), but won the Battle of la Loma (16 July 1865) under the command of Lieutenant-Colonel (later General) Alfred van der Smissen.

Faced with this complex situation, Maximilian resolved, under pressure from Marshal Bazaine and the French army, to adopt a policy of harsh repression against the rebels. He published the "Black Decree" on 3 October 1865, which, while promising an amnesty to the dissidents who surrendered, declared in its first article: "All individuals belonging to bands or armed gatherings existing without legal authorization, whether or not they proclaim a political pretext [...] will be tried militarily by the martial courts. If they are guilty, even though it is only the mere fact of belonging to an armed gang, they will be condemned to death and the sentence will be executed in 24 hours". Under this decree, several hundred rebels and political opponents were summarily executed.

Trip to Yucatán. Departure from Mexico

On 6 November 1865, Charlotte began an official visit to the remote province of Yucatán, which lasted almost two months. Without Maximilian, but accompanied by an imposing retinue, she departed on the Tabasco, a ship in poor condition whose pitching made the crossing of the Gulf of Mexico very difficult. Yucatán, far from the tragic events that bloodied the rest of Mexico, gave a relatively warm welcome to the Empress. This trip commenced with a succession of festivities preceding her arrival in Mérida, capital of the province. Charlotte then took the opportunity to visit the ruins of the ancient Maya city of Uxmal, where she admired the archaeological curiosities. While there, she wrote a series of letters and reports on the peninsula that are now archived in the National Archives of Austria and the Library of Congress. When Charlotte met Maximilian again in Cuernavaca, the day before New Year's Day 1866, he informed her of the new legislative projects he had conceived. Charlotte and her husband stayed for a few days in Cuernavaca, where on the morning of 6 January, she learned of the death of her father King Leopold I of Belgium almost four weeks before. Two months later, on 24 March, Charlotte heard that her maternal grandmother Maria Amalia, Dowager Queen consort of the French; to whom she was deeply attached, had died in England.

In January 1866, Emperor Napoleon III, influenced by French public hostility to the Mexican expedition, decided to begin the withdrawal of his troops supporting the Imperial cause in Mexico. This strategic pullback was a potentially fatal blow to the infant Mexican monarchy; at the end of the withdrawal of the French expeditionary force, Maximilian would only have the support of a small force of imperial Mexican soldiers and a contingent of Belgian and Austrian volunteers, which were easily outnumbered by rebel forces. The announcement of the French withdrawal encouraged the Belgian legation to leave the country. In a desperate attempt to save her husband's throne, Charlotte resolved to personally persuade Napoleon III to reconsider his decision. On 9 July 1866, Charlotte, with Maximilian's concurrence, set sail for Europe from the port of Veracruz upon the transatlantic ocean liner Impératrice Eugénie. She was accompanied by Martín del Castillo y Cos, Minister of Foreign Affairs, and her two adoptive sons, the Princes of Iturbide.

Subsequently, a rumor circulated that Charlotte, shortly before her trip to Europe, had become pregnant by her aide-de-camp Alfred van der Smissen and had given birth to a son in early 1867. This rumour has since been debunked by historians.

Return to Europe

On 8 August 1866, Empress Charlotte arrived in Europe with her two adoptive sons and Martín del Castillo, at the harbour of Saint-Nazaire, where they were greeted by Juan Almonte and his wife, instead of an official welcoming ceremony. From there, she took a train for Paris, where she arrived on 9 August. During the trip, Charlotte had received a telegraph from Napoleon III, informing her that he was terribly ill, but this did little to dissuade her. At the Château de Saint-Cloud, the bedridden Napoleon III received a telegram from Charlotte requesting an interview. He first sent his wife Empress Eugénie to the Le Grand Hôtel where Charlotte was staying, hoping to deter the determined Empress of Mexico from her plans to meet him in person. But Charlotte could not be dissuaded and Eugénie made arrangements for a first meeting between the two of them the next day, 11 August, at Saint-Cloud.

Despite carefully preparing her arguments in a twenty-page brief, the meeting between Charlotte and Napoleon III ended in complete failure. She gave a long, impassioned speech reminding Napoleon III of his promises and the Treaty of Miramar, but the Emperor was unwavering in his position, affirming that he could not decide anything without the approval of his ministers and that he refused to negotiate new financial and military guarantees in favour of Mexico. Her mission ruined, Charlotte began manifesting symptoms of paranoia and had profound cognitive and emotional collapse. Two days later, she returned to Saint-Cloud to attempt another negotiation with Napoleon III. A lively discussion broke out in the presence of Empress Eugénie, who sank into an armchair, pretending to faint. The first signs of Charlotte's mental breakdown became evident here, when, overwhelmed by sadness, she threw herself into a nearby armchair, sobbing hysterically. The Council of Ministers of 18 August 1866 confirmed the position of Napoleon III and formally opposed maintaining any military presence by France in Mexico. On 19 August, Napoleon III went personally to Le Grand Hôtel for a third and final meeting with Charlotte, to confirm to her that France would no longer continue to act in Mexico.

Shaken by Napoleon III's refusal, on 21 August Charlotte left France for Miramare Castle in Trieste; on the journey there, her mental health showed signs of worsening — passing by a farmer, she became convinced that he was an assassin. She persistently shouted at her coachman to drive faster. She avoided going through Brussels and Vienna due to the withdrawal of the Belgian and Austrian troops from Mexico, and Charlotte did not seek help from either her or her husband's families. Charlotte's late father, King Leopold I, had been doubtful of the Mexican adventure, and his son, now Leopold II, while once a staunch supporter of his sister's ambitions, could no longer ignore the hostility of the Belgians towards further involvement in Mexico, especially in view of the significant losses incurred there by the Belgian Legion. Charlotte was now isolated and could no longer count on further European support.

Once at Miramare, Charlotte found a message from Maximilian waiting for her, imploring her to seek an audience with Pope Pius IX in Rome. After a one-month stay in Trieste, Charlotte left for the Vatican to try and win continuing support from the pontiff for the Imperial regime in Mexico. Pope Pius IX, however, saw no reason to further implicate the Church in the disastrous Mexican venture. On her way to Rome, Charlotte showed further signs of deteriorating mental health; while stopping for the night at the city of Bolzano (German: Botzen) in South Tyrol, then part of the Austrian Empire, Charlotte informed Martín del Castillo that she felt unwell and insisted that it was due to being poisoned by spies and traitors among her party. 

On 24 September 1866, Charlotte arrived in Rome. Three days later, on 27 September, she had an audience with Pope Pius IX, but as was expected, the pontiff was reluctant to use his influence to intervene in French politics on the behalf of the Mexican Empire. Charlotte became despondent. Overwhelmed by despair and paranoia, she shut herself within her hotel. She dressed in mourning clothes and, in fear of poison, denied herself food and water. She asked to be taken to the Trevi Fountain to quench her thirst after not having consumed any liquid since the previous day. On 1 October, Charlotte went to the Vatican for a further meeting with the Pope, still dressed in mourning and with her face reportedly displaying sunken eyes and flushed cheeks. Crying hysterically, she refused to return to her hotel and begged to be sheltered for the night in the papal apartments, convinced that assassins sent by Napoleon III were waiting for her outside. The Pope let Charlotte eat part of his own dinner and, breaking the rules of the Holy See, had a bed moved into the pontifical library for her, making Charlotte the first woman known to have slept in the Vatican. In the following days, she confined herself to her hotel room, leaving only to drink water from public fountains, with a goblet that she had taken from the papal apartments.

King Leopold II grew worried about the news he received from Charlotte, so he sent his brother Prince Philippe, Count of Flanders to Rome, where he arrived on 8 October 1866. Two days later, Prince Philippe escorted his very depressed and unstable sister, and the two princes of Iturbide, to Miramare Castle. There, Charlotte persisted in her obsession with poisoning. The Count of Flanders reported their sister's erratic and strange behaviour to King Leopold II. After examining the Empress, Josef Gottfried von Riedel, a Viennese alienist physician, diagnosed "madness with fixed ideas of persecution", believing that the Mexican climate and the humiliating treatment that Charlotte received in France aggravated her condition. At Miramare, Charlotte was sequestered in the pavilion of the Gartenhaus, supervised by Austrian security agents.

When the news of the capture of Maximilian by Mexican Republican forces and his execution at Santiago de Querétaro on 19 June 1867 became known, the Belgian royal family interrupted their visit to Paris for the International Exposition, and returned to Brussels in early July 1867. Ultimately, Charlotte's family elected not to tell her of her husband's demise. With Maximilian's death, guardianship of Charlotte became an issue: she had so far accepted her confinement in Miramare, then in Austrian territory, believing that her husband demanded this confinement for her safety. Her brother, Leopold II, believed that there was no reason for Charlotte to stay in Austria and preferred that she return to her homeland of Belgium. However, after the arrest of Maximilian on 15 May, his brother Emperor Franz Joseph I had restored Maximilian's rights and titles as member of the House of Habsburg in an attempt to save his life, convinced that the rebels wouldn't dare to shoot an Austrian Archduke. Subsequently, Charlotte regained her status as an Archduchess of Austria and, therefore, her in-laws remained her legal guardians.

The Emperor of Austria sent Count Karl of Bombelles, and doctor August von Jilek, a friend of Maximilian, to Miramare Castle on behalf of the Habsburgs. Following the orders of Franz Joseph I, the Count of Bombelles argued to keep Charlotte in Miramare. In July 1867, King Leopold II sent his wife, Queen Marie Henriette of Austria and his confidant Baron Auguste Goffinet to Vienna to plead with the Emperor to allow for the release of Charlotte and her return to Belgium as soon as possible. When Queen Marie Henriette arrived at Miramare on 14 July 1867, she discovered Charlotte in a terrible physical and mental state, having been treated as a prisoner by the Austrian security forces for the last nine months. After two weeks of negotiations, Queen Marie Henriette and Goffinet succeeded in removing Charlotte from the guardianship of her in-laws and convincing her to return with them to Belgium. This success was largely thanks to Jan Frans Bulckens, a Belgian psychiatrist sent by Leopold II to care for his sister. Bulckens and his medical team kept Charlotte under close observation and determined that, due to the Dowager Empress' mental state, she could not be told of the execution of her husband. With the help of this medical team, Queen Marie Henriette devised a plan to give her sister-in-law a faked telegram from Maximilian, in which he asked her to come back to Brussels. The scheme worked and Charlotte, with the Belgian delegation, left Miramare for the last time.

After Charlotte's departure from Austria, Vienna and Brussels continued to argue over the issue of Charlotte's inheritance. Emperor Franz Joseph I placed his sister-in-law in the custody of his younger brother, Archduke Karl Ludwig of Austria in order to preserve her patrimony. Historian André Castelot in his work Maximilien et Charlotte : la tragédie de l'ambition confirmed the theory that, after the execution of Maximilian in Mexico, Charlotte's in-laws were concerned mostly with the fate of her fortune rather than the health and wellbeing of Charlotte herself. For the Austrian Imperial Court, it was in their financial interest to keep her in Miramare. There, her fortune was guarded under the care of Eduard von Radonetz, the prefect of Miramare, but when she returned to Belgium, the Viennese court was forced to pay her dowry to Leopold II.

Return to Belgium

Upon her arrival in Belgium, Charlotte resided until 8 October 1867 in the Pavilion de Tervueren near Brussels, which was built by Charles Vander Straeten for King William II of the Netherlands. The residence, however, was insufficiently furnished and poorly heated in the winter. She therefore joined King Leopold II and Queen Marie Henriette at the Palace of Laeken, where she moved into the former apartments of her brothers. When Charlotte finally learned, in January 1868, of the execution of her husband six months prior, she was shattered. In a set of nearly 400 letters found in 1995 (mainly intended for a French officer whom she had met in Mexico, Charles Loysel), she declares herself "dead" at the fall of the Mexican Empire. These letters by their number and their length (sometimes up to twenty pages) also offer the testimony of her daily life punctuated by paranoia attacks and the treatment given to her.

Charlotte's two adopted sons, the Princes of Iturbide, followed her to Belgium, but later both were sent to study in England. Agustín de Iturbide y Green later emigrated to the United States, while Salvador de Iturbide y de Marzán remained in Europe. In May 1869, Charlotte left the Palace of Laeken to return to the Pavilion de Tervueren, where 37 people were assigned to her service. She continued a passionate worship of her late husband's memory, collecting everything that had belonged to him. After the Pavilion de Tervueren was destroyed by a fire on 2 March 1879 (which Charlotte was paradoxically delighted by), she resided permanently at Bouchout Castle in Meise (not far from the Palace of Laeken), which her brother, King Leopold II, acquired for her. In the final years of his life, the King diligently supervised the care of his sister. The Dowager Empress of Mexico wrote notes of profound gratitude for the care she received from her brother and nephews.

Later years
Charlotte disappeared completely from the public sphere, protected by the high gates of her domain and the guards which protected them. She received visits only from her family: mainly from her sisters-in-law, Queen Marie Henriette and the Countess of Flanders. On Sundays, an abbot came to say mass at Bouchout Castle. To distract herself, she went on walks, embroidered, played cards and listened to her gramophone. She was not informed of the death of her close relatives (King Leopold II in 1909 and her sister-in-law, the Countess of Flanders, wife of her brother Philippe, in 1912), nor that of her servants because she never asked questions about their absence.

Her lady-in-waiting, Hélène, Countess of Reinach-Foussemagne, said about Charlotte: "Most of the time, the unfortunate woman was absorbed in long silences, or on the contrary in heated discussions in French, English, German, Italian, Spanish, with imaginary interlocutors, discussions too incoherent, too disjointed for one to be able to guess what thoughts occupied this brain. [...] In her soliloquies pass from time to time, very rarely, sentences, interjections which prove that sometimes her obscured thought returns on these lamentable memories: Sir, one told you that one had had a husband; a husband, sir, and then madness! Madness is made of events! If he had been helped by Napoleon!...". For their part, Princess Marie-José and Prince Charles recalled their visits to their great-aunt, remembering an elderly lady making confused remarks. Periods of lucidity became rarer over time. In crises of destructive monomania, she gave in to outbursts of uncontrollable anger and destroyed crockery and crystal vases, set her hounds on a maid, and tore up pictures and books. This alternated with periods of calm when she peacefully undertook simple occupations.

During World War I, Belgium was invaded. Only a tiny part of the country remained free of German occupation, the town of De Panne, where King Albert I, Charlotte's nephew, lived until the signing of the Armistice of 11 November 1918. Charlotte did not see her family during the war. Despite the conflict, her status as Archduchess of Austria protected her from the German occupier, and her way of life remained unchanged. She flew the Austro-Hungarian flag on the roof of Bouchout Castle; and in March 1916, a German officer inquired as to why the Austrian colors flew on a property in occupied Belgium. In response, General Moritz von Bissing, at the head of the Imperial German General Government of Belgium, had a sign affixed to the gates of the castle, which read as follows: "This domain, property of the Crown of Belgium, is occupied by Her Majesty the Empress of Mexico, Archduchess Maximilian of Austria, sister-in-law of Emperor Franz Joseph, our illustrious ally. I order the German soldiers passing by here not to ring the bell and to leave the place untouched".

Death
Charlotte died peacefully at Bouchout Castle on 19 January 1927, at the age of 86, after developing pneumonia brought on by influenza. About her last words on her deathbed, there are various versions about which were exactly:

According to Prince Michael of Greece, she sighed holding a rosary and murmuring: 
According to José Iturriaga De la Fuente: 
According to S. van Eckhaus: 
According to Caroline de Bransner, one of her ladies-in-waiting, in relation to having been reclined on her bed instead of her lounger as she wished: 

Three days later, on 22 January, and under heavy snow, her coffin was carried by six former Belgian Legionaries who survived the Expedition to Mexico. She was buried in the Royal Crypt of the Church of Our Lady of Laeken, in the presence of King Albert I and his sons, the Duke of Brabant and the Count of Flanders. On 25 January, a funeral service was celebrated in the church of Meise in the presence of the entire Belgian Royal family: King Albert I, Queen Elisabeth, their three children the Duke of Brabant, the Count of Flanders and Princess Marie-José, the Duchess of Brabant, the Prince and Princess Napoleon, as well as Princess Clémentine. Much of Charlotte's personal fortune was managed by King Leopold II, and was eventually used to finance the colonial enterprise of Congo.

Since 1902, Charlotte had hosted the painter Edwin Ganz in her domain of Bouchout, who was a specialist in the representation of horses and close to the royal family, in particular Princess Clémentine. After Charlotte's death, the artist continued to occupy the outbuildings of the castle until his death in 1948.

In 1938, the Belgian State bought Bouchout Castle with the intention to establish the National Botanical Garden of Belgium, which had grown too cramped on its Brussels site, and the land was inaugurated 20 years later. This garden took the name of Meise Botanic Garden in 2014; the interior of the castle was redeveloped from 1980 into meeting and conference rooms, to accommodate congresses, exhibitions and other festive events.

Charlotte's mental illness
The nature of Charlotte's mental pathology, psychosis, paranoia, monomania, proved extremely difficult to determine with certainty a posteriori, giving rise to several hypotheses.

Several authors put forward an origin caused by intoxication. This hypothesis is notably put forward by Joan Haslip, who reveals that one of the Mexican court doctors added bromide to Charlotte's coffee without her knowing. In Mexico, from July 1867, rumours spread that the madness of the Empress was attributed to a poison which had been given to her regularly in small doses. Roger Heim's research corroborates this possibility, namely that Charlotte could have been "little by little intoxicated while she was still in Mexico, by the introduction in her food for a prolonged time of a psychotropic drug". When she made an official visit to Yucatán, Charlotte wrote to her husband on 8 December 1865: "The doctor is very nice. Without her well-suited little medications, I would probably have fallen ill and could not have taken all of this. On several occasions it seemed to me that there was poison in the air".

Other authors, such as Laurence Van Ypersele, Émile Meurice, Dominique Paoli and Coralie Vankerkhoven, relying both on Charlotte's correspondence (in the year 1869 alone, from February to June, she wrote some 400 letters and notes) and on the reports written by the doctors who examined her, favoured the study of the psychological aspect of the pathology of Charlotte. They evoke biographical and personal influences to explain the Empress' dementia, namely: the loss of her mother at only 10 years old (who originated the radical transformation of her playful and expansive character towards introversion), her keen sense of duty, her high religiosity, her latent mysticism, her euphoria during her engagement, her idealization of Maximilian, the absence of conjugal life, the disenchantments and disillusions in Italy, and then in Mexico. Coralie Vankerkhoven also mentions the first warning signs of the disease: notably, the discomfort she felt in Uxmal (where the first signs of her psychosis arose from the strangeness of the conditions during her stay in Yucatán), and her reaction to the successive announcements of the deaths of her father and grandmother, until her arrival in Europe where her delusional disorder will settle permanently.

Titles and honours

Titles
At her birth, as the daughter of King Leopold I, Charlotte was titled Princess of Saxe-Coburg and Gotha and Duchess in Saxony, with the predicate of Royal Highness, according to the titles of her house, and bears the unofficial title of Princess of Belgium, which would be officially regularized by Royal Decree dated 14 March 1891.

Honours
  Mexican Empire:
 Grand Mistress and Dame Grand Cross of the Imperial Order of San Carlos for Noble Ladies
 Dame Grand Cross of the Imperial Order of the Mexican Eagle
 Dame Grand Cross of the Imperial Order of Guadalupe
 : Dame of the Imperial Order of the Starry Cross
 : Dame Grand Cross of Honour and Devotion
 : Dame Grand Cross of the Order of Saint Isabel, 19 April 1865
 : 525th Dame of the Order of Queen Maria Luisa, 22 December 1857

Arms

Ancestry

In popular culture

Movies
Mexican director Miguel Contreras Torres dedicated four films to the imperial couple. In these four films, the Empress is played by his wife, the Liechtenstein actress Medea de Novara: Juárez y Maximiliano (1934), La paloma (1937), The Mad Empress (1939) and Caballería del imperio (1942).
 Bette Davis portrayed Empress Charlotte in the film Juarez (1939), directed by William Dieterle.
 Helena Rojo portrayed the Empress in the film Those Years (Spanish: Aquellos años, 1973).
In the 2016 movie 20th Century Women, Greta Gerwig's character names her love birds Carlota and Maximilian.

Plays
 Maximilien, historical opera in three acts and nine scenes; book by RS Hoffman inspired by the drama Juárez und Maximilian by Franz Werfel; music by Darius Milhaud (1932).
 Carlota, one-act opera by Francisco Zendejas; music by Luis Sandi (1948).
 Charlotte's "little homesick chapel" in Mexico City is referenced as a tourist destination in Tennessee Williams's play The Night of the Iguana (1961).
 The musical Carlota: A Serpentine Crown (2009), by composer and scenarist Marcel Wick, portrays Charlotte as a woman driven by ambition towards inevitable disaster.
 La emperatriz de la mentira, opera by Ángel Norzagaray; music by Dmitri Dudin (2012).
 The Empress is the central character of Adiós Mamá Carlota (2019), a historical play written by Luis Valdez that premiered at the San Jose Stage Company.
 Charlotte as an elderly widow is the focus of "Throne of Shadows", an audio drama written by Thomas E. Fuller and performed by the Atlanta Radio Theatre Company.

Television
 Charlotte is referenced in the first season of The Dick Van Dyke Show in an episode titled "Empress Carlotta's Necklace" (1961).
 María Rivas portrayed the Empress in the historical telenovela Maximiliano y Carlota (1965), directed by Ernesto Alonso.
 Christine Wodetzky portrayed Empress Charlotte in the TV miniseries Maximilian von Mexiko (1970).
 Nelly Meden portrayed Empress Charlotte in another historical telenovela, El carruaje (1972).
 Bernard Juncker and Jean-Marie De Coninck made in 1993 a documentary Charlotte et Maximilien, or L'Empire des archidupes for RTBF, based on a screenplay by Janine Lambotte.
 Laura Flores also portrayed the Empress in a historical telenovela, The Flight of the Eagle (Spanish: El vuelo del águila, 1994–1995), which was also directed by Ernesto Alonso.
 Marisol Santacruz portrayed Empress Charlotte in an episode of the Mexican documentary television series Secretos de nuestra historia (2006), which features "virtual interviews" with historical figures of Mexico.
 Federica De Cola portrayed Empress Charlotte in the TV miniseries Sisi (2009), directed by Xaver Schwarzenberger.
 The program Secrets d'Histoire on France 3 from 9 December 2019, entitled Charlotte et Maximilien, les sombres héros de Mexico, is dedicated to her. The actress playing the Empress Charlotte in the evocation sequences is Charlotte Aftassi.

Novels
 El cerro de las campanas (1868) by Juan Antonio Mateos.
 Noticias del Imperio (1986), by Fernando del Paso, shows a literary portrait of the Empress and her madness.
 Charlotte ou la nuit mexicaine (1989) by Liliane Wouters.
 Mamá Carlota (2008) by Adolfo Arrioja Vizcaíno.
 El último príncipe del Imperio Mexicano (2010) by C. M. Mayo.
 Juárez en el Convento de las Capuchinas: La reunión secreta con Maximiliano (2014) by Adam J. Oderoll.
 Carlota: La Emperatriz Que Enloquecio de Amor (2017), by Laura Martínez-Belli.

Comic
In 2018, Dargaud published the first volume of a series of biographical comics, Charlotte impératrice - La Princesse et l'Archiduc, by Matthieu Bonhomme (drawing) and Fabien Nury (screenplay). The second volume, entitled Charlotte impératrice - L'Empire, appears on 12 June 2020 and two other volumes are planned.

Music
In 1866, the liberal writer Vicente Riva Palacio composed a satirical song called Adiós, mamá Carlota (Goodbye, mother Carlota), criticizing Carlota, the imperialists and conservative politicians. It's based on the poem Adiós, oh Patria mía (Goodbye, my homeland) written in 1842 by Ignacio Rodríguez Galván.
The American composer Charles Wakefield Cadman composed a work in 1944 for violoncello and piano called "A Mad Empress Remembers", inspired by Carlota's last years.

See also

List of heads of state of Mexico
 Baron Auguste Goffinet

Notes

References

Bibliography

Others

External links

 Imperial House of Mexico
 
 

|-

|-

1840 births
1927 deaths
19th-century Belgian people
20th-century Belgian people
19th-century Belgian women
20th-century Belgian women
19th-century Mexican people
19th-century Mexican women
Mexican imperial consorts
Mexican monarchy
Maximilian I of Mexico
Princesses of Saxe-Coburg and Gotha
House of Saxe-Coburg and Gotha (Belgium)
Independent Mexico
Austrian princesses
Belgian princesses
Belgian emigrants to Mexico
History of Mexico
Second French intervention in Mexico
People from Laeken
House of Habsburg-Lorraine
Burials at the Church of Our Lady of Laeken
Dames of Malta
Royalty and nobility with disabilities
Deaths from pneumonia in Belgium
Daughters of kings